In The County Of Kings is the fifth album (fourth full-length album) from the Eric Stuart Band, in which Eric Stuart is the songwriter and lead singer.  This album was released in 2007 under Stuart's own independent label, Widow's Peak Records.  The title of the album comes from Kings County, Brooklyn, where Stuart was born and raised.  In addition, the front cover art depicts the Brooklyn Bridge and New York City in juxtaposition with the Great Pyramid, the Sphinx of Giza, and the Valley of the Kings, which are in Egypt. The musical style of In The County Of Kings is more country-sounding than any previous Eric Stuart Band album, and is described by Eric Stuart as "Concrete Country." With regard to this, Stuart writes,I was trying to come up with a way to explain the type of music I play. Americana was too rootsy, Folk-Rock only touched on a part of my sound and County/Rock made it sound like I wore a cowboy hat. I am born and raised in Brooklyn, New York, but I play music with a strong lyrical, melodic, story based approach. There are many country elements as well. I thought the combination of "Concrete" to connect with the sidewalks and buildings I grew up around as well as the rock connotations that word brings plus the "Country" would show I was touching on string songwriting and storytelling that went with country music.

In The County Of Kings includes a re-release of Stuart's songs "The Bottom Line" (1996, from the album Picture Perfect World), and "Paint the Town Tonight" (2000, from the album BombShellShocked).  The album also incorporates more guest musicians than in previous ESB albums. Stuart sings with his sister Barbara Brousal in "The Land Of What Might Have Been." Not all the songs call in numerous accompaniments however; in "This Love," Stuart is only accompanied by band members Jenna Malizia (background vocals) and Questar Welsh (background vocals and keyboards).

Track list 
"The Bottom Line" (re-release) (4:27) (©1996)
"Blind Man" (3:39) (©2004)
"Paint The Town Tonight" (re-release) (3:06) (©2000)
"I'd Be A Millionaire" (3:44) (©2001)
"Is It True?" (2:34) (©2001)
"The Last Word" (3:21) (©1998)
"State Of Mind" (5:10) (©1996)
"Shut You Up" (2:21) (©2001)
"Hand-Me Down Love" (2:56) (©2000)
"Land Of What Might Have Been" (3:50) (©2001)
"Blind Trust" (3:29) (©2000)
"Jack And Jill" (4:20) (©1997)
"Bad Luck" (3:21) (©1997)
"Too Late Tonight To Be Alone" (3:55) (©2000)
"This Love" (4:02) (©2005)

Album personnel 
Eric Stuart - lead vocals, acoustic guitar, rhythm guitar, hand claps
Phil Nix - lead guitar, rhythm guitar, baritone guitar, vocals, slide guitar, electric 12 string guitar, hand claps
Questar Welsh - vocals, electric 12 string guitar, additional keyboards, acoustic 12 string guitar
Kevin Merritt - accordion, vocals, horn arrangements
Jenna Malizia - vocals
Mason Swearingen - bass, vocals
Jagoda - drums, percussion, vocals
Benny Landa - lead guitar, rhythm guitar
Barbara Brousal - vocals
Irwin Fisch - piano/organ
Maria Conti - violin (also knocks on violin in "The Bottom Line")
John Siegler - bass
Frank Vilardi - drums, tambourine, shaker
Elizabeth Dotson-Westphalen - trombone
Dan Schlessinger - tenor saxophone
David Smith - trumpet
Julie Reyburn - vocals
Darren Dunstan - vocals
Louis Cortelezzi - tenor saxophone, baritone saxophone
Jim Malone - harmonica
Larry Campbell - pedal steel
Rachel Handman - fiddle

All songs written by Eric Stuart ©2007 Little Black Book (BMI)
Produced by Eric Stuart and Questar Welsh
Engineered by Questar Welsh

References

External links 
 Ericstuart.com
 Pecky Pudgeon Reports on the Eric Stuart Band

2007 albums
Eric Stuart Band albums